The Egyptian Commodities Exchange (EGYCOMEX) is a proposed commodities exchange in Egypt.

A three-member consortium signed cooperation protocol with Egyptian government to establish a US$35–50m worth electronic Egyptian Commodities Exchange in Egypt as the first ever country in the MENA region; it will facilitate the well-being of the small farmers and supply of products at reasonable prices abolishing the monopoly of goods.

See also
Alternative Exchange
List of futures exchanges
List of stock exchanges
List of African stock exchanges

References

External links
 Egyptian Commodities Exchange (EGYCOMEX)(official website)

Companies based in Cairo
Commodity exchanges in Egypt
Futures exchanges